Rat House Lake is a lake in Aitkin County, Minnesota, in the United States.

Rat House Lake was named from the presence of muskrats.

See also
List of lakes in Minnesota

References

Lakes of Minnesota
Lakes of Aitkin County, Minnesota